King Cole for Kids is an album by jazz pianist Nat King Cole, released by the Capitol Records label.

The album was recorded on August 15, 22 and 27, 1947, released as a 78 r.p.m. record in 1947, and reissued in 1951 on a 10-inch LP.

Track listing

78 r.p.m. album (1947)

 "Ke-Mo-Ki-Mo (The Magic Song)"
 "Old MacDonald Had a Farm"
 "(Go To Sleep) My Sleepy Head"
 "Nursery Rhymes"
 "The Three Trees"
 "There's a Train Out for Dreamland"

10 inch LP (1951) 
 "Ke-Mo-Ki-Mo (The Magic Song)"
 "Old MacDonald Had a Farm"
 "(Go To Sleep) My Sleepy Head"
 "Nursery Rhymes"
 "The Three Trees"
 "There's a Train Out for Dreamland"
 "Three Blind Mice"
 "I Wanna Be a Friend of Yours"

Personnel 
Nat King Cole – piano, arranger, celesta
Oscar Moore – guitar
Johnny Miller – double bass
Pinto Colvig – sound effects
Frank DeVol –  arranger on tracks 3 and 6 on the 78 r.p.m. album (1947)

References
A Pile o' Cole's Nat King Cole Website

Nat King Cole albums
1947 albums
Albums arranged by Frank De Vol
Capitol Records albums
Children's music albums by American artists
Albums arranged by Nat King Cole